is a Japanese puzzle and role-playing smartphone game published by GCrest. It was released on Android and iOS devices in 2015. An original net animation by Satelight was released in 2017. An anime television series adaptation by Project No.9 premiered from July 5 to September 20, 2018. Sentai Filmworks have licensed the anime and are streaming it on Hidive.

Plot summary
A normal girl is transported to another world, known as the Dream World. Here, dreams are the energy of all beings living within it. The protagonist is revealed to be the long-lost Princess of Traumere and therefore the princess of the Dream World, and she must defend the world from creatures known as Dream Eaters, who steal people's dreams. Using a special ring, she must rescue the various princes of the world, trapped in eternal slumber within their own rings, and team up with them to save the Dream World.

Gameplay
The game is a time-based match-3 strategy puzzle game. Players assemble a team of 5 princes and combat Dream Eaters in quests of varying difficulty. Princes are divided into 5 attribute categories: Sexy, Passion, Cute, Gentle, and Cool. The pieces on the game board reflect these attributes and erasing 3 or more pieces of the same color adds to the attack of princes on the player's team of the matching color. Players have a limited amount of time each turn to erase as many pieces as they can. Princes also have special skills that can be used during combat that can improve a player's chance of clearing the challenge. Weekly events and gacha allow players many opportunities to recruit more princes for their teams, and each event releases new variations of the princes.

Part of gameplay also involves a role-play element. Players will have the opportunity to name the protagonist at the beginning of the game, and this is the name that will appear throughout the game when referring to the player in their role as Princess of Traumere. Each prince has their own story interacting with the protagonist that can be read in its entirety when a prince is completely leveled up and 'awakened'. As players read through a prince's story, they will be given a dialogue choice at various points. Certain answers will award Sun Drops and others will award Moon Drops. Whichever there are more of at the end of the story will determine which route the prince can awaken to: Sun or Moon. At this point, the story will split and the conclusion for the Sun Route will be different from the Moon Route. This awakening will also affect a prince's stats and skills.

Anime characters
 The Heroine
 Avi
 Navi
 Gary
 Gilbert
 Douglas
 Rosso
 Orion
 Kiel
 Setique
 Kegaremaru
 Frost
 Graysia
 Schnee

Reception

Notes

References

External links
 

2015 video games
2017 anime ONAs
2018 anime television series debuts
Android (operating system) games
Anime television series based on video games
IOS games
Isekai anime and manga
Manga series
Otome games
Project No.9
Puzzle video games
Role-playing video games
Satelight
Sentai Filmworks
Video games developed in Japan
Video games scored by Masafumi Takada
Medialink